Botille Vette-Welsh (born 13 September 1996) is a New Zealand-born Australian rugby league player who plays as a  for the Parramatta Eels in the NRL Women's Premiership  and  Wests Tigers in the NSWRL Women's Premiership.

She previously played for the St George Illawarra Dragons and Sydney Roosters and has represented Australia and New South Wales.

Playing career
Before switching to rugby league, Vette-Welsh played rugby sevens for Macquarie University. In 2017, Vette-Welsh represented the NSW City side while playing for Cronulla-Caringbah.

2018
In 2018, Vette-Welsh played for Cabramatta in the NSWRL Women's Premiership and represented NSW City at the Women's National Championships.

In Round 1 of the 2018 NRL Women's Premiership, Vette-Welsh made her debut for the Sydney Roosters, starting at fullback in their 10–4 loss to the New Zealand Warriors.

2019
On 18 March, she joined the Wests Tigers NSWRL Women's Premiership team.

In May, she represented NSW City at the Women's National Championships.

On 14 June, she joined the St George Illawarra Dragons NRLW team. On 21 June, she made her State of Origin debut for New South Wales.

In October, she represented Australia at the 2019 Rugby League World Cup 9s. On 25 October, she made her Test debut for Australia in a 8–28 win over New Zealand.

2020

On 22 September, Vette-Welsh re-joined the Roosters NRLW team.

2021
On 20 February, she represented the Māori All Stars in their 24–0 win over the Indigenous All Stars.

References

1996 births
Living people
New Zealand Māori rugby league players
New Zealand female rugby league players
Australia women's national rugby league team players
Rugby league fullbacks
Sydney Roosters (NRLW) players
St. George Illawarra Dragons (NRLW) players
Wests Tigers NSWRL Women's Premiership players
People from Kaitaia